Josef Mucha (born 10 July 1967) is a Czech former professional football player. As a midfielder, he played in the Gambrinus liga, making over 250 appearances over the course of 11 seasons, playing over 200 league matches for SK Sigma Olomouc as well as playing for FC Tescoma Zlín.

Mucha subsequently embarked on becoming a trainer / coach and managed or become assistant at a couple of teams. He debuted as manager by 1. HFK Olomouc during the 2008–09 Czech 2. Liga season, where he was replaced by Miroslav Kouřil after 18 matches of the season. Mucha is currently the assistant manager of 1. FC Slovácko.

The professional tennis player Karolína Muchová is his daughter.

Career

Mucha started his career with RH Znojmo.

References

External links

1967 births
Living people
Czechoslovak footballers
Czech footballers
Czech First League players
FC Fastav Zlín players
SK Sigma Olomouc players
Czech football managers
1. HFK Olomouc managers
Association football midfielders
MFK Karviná managers
Sportspeople from Prostějov